Janko Pleterski (1 February 1923 – 8 June 2018) was a Slovenian historian, politician and diplomat.

He was born on 1 February 1923 in Maribor, Slovenia, then part of the Kingdom of Serbs, Croats and Slovenes. He attended high school in Ljubljana. In August 1941, he was arrested by the Fascist authorities of the Italian-occupied Province of Ljubljana and imprisoned in Alessandria, Italy. After the Italian armistice in September 1943, he returned to Ljubljana. In July 1944, he joined the partisan resistance. After the end of World War II, he worked at the Yugoslav foreign ministry in Belgrade as an expert on border issues with Italy and Austria. In 1953, he became a researcher at the Institute for Ethnic Studies in Ljubljana. In 1963, he obtained a PhD in modern history at the University of Ljubljana. Between 1970 and 1982, he taught modern political history of Slovenes and South Slavs at the same university. Between 1988 and 1990, he was member of the Presidential Council of the Socialist Republic of Slovenia, as part of the reformist circle of the Communist Party of Slovenia around Milan Kučan and Janez Stanovnik who negotiated with the opposition a gradual democratisation of Slovenia. In 1989, he became a member of the Slovenian Academy of Sciences and Arts.

Pleterski wrote extensively on the Slovene history of late 19th and early 20th century, with an emphasis on the history of Carinthian Slovenes, and on the relations between Slovenes and other Yugoslav peoples.

He was the father of the historian and archeologist Andrej Pleterski.

References 

1923 births
2018 deaths
20th-century Slovenian historians
Yugoslav diplomats
Yugoslav Partisans members
University of Ljubljana alumni
Academic staff of the University of Ljubljana
Members of the Slovenian Academy of Sciences and Arts
Politicians from Maribor
League of Communists of Slovenia politicians
Ethnic Slovene people
Yugoslav historians